William Matthew Ketchum (September 2, 1921 – June 24, 1978) was an American businessman and military veteran who served as a U.S. representative from California from 1973 to 1978.

Early life and career 
Ketchum was born on September 2, 1921 in Los Angeles, California. He attended schools in Los Angeles County and military school in North Hollywood, California.

He attended Colorado School of Mines from 1939 to 1940, and the University of Southern California from 1940 to 1942.

Military service 
He entered the United States Army in 1942 and served in the Pacific before discharge in 1946. Recalled into service during the Korean War and served from 1950 to 1953.

Business career
He owned and operated a hardware and auto-supply store from 1946 to 1950. Salesman from 1953 to 1957. He engaged in cattle ranching and farming. He served as member of the Republican State Central committee from 1964 to 1966.

Political career 
He served as member of the California Assembly from 1967 to 1973. He served as delegate to the Republican National Convention, 1968.

Death
Ketchum died of a heart attack on June 24, 1978 in Bakersfield, California, at the age of 56. He was survived by his sister Frances Lindenberg (February 23, 1914 – November 2010).

See also
 List of United States Congress members who died in office (1950–99)

References

External links
 

1921 births
1978 deaths
Politicians from Los Angeles
Military personnel from California
Colorado School of Mines alumni
University of Southern California alumni
United States Army personnel of World War II
Republican Party members of the United States House of Representatives from California
20th-century American politicians
Politicians from Bakersfield, California